Yim Tae-hee (Hanja: 任太熙; born 1 December 1956) is a South Korean politician and former chief presidential secretary to Lee Myung-bak.

References

Living people
Seoul National University alumni
Liberty Korea Party politicians
1956 births
South Korean presidential candidates, 2012
Pungcheon Im clan
Chiefs of Staff to the President of South Korea
Labor ministers of South Korea